A test method is a method for a test in science or engineering, such as a physical test, chemical test, or statistical test. It is a definitive procedure that produces a test result. In order to ensure accurate and relevant test results, a test method should be "explicit, unambiguous, and experimentally feasible.", as well as effective and reproducible.

A test can be considered an observation or experiment that determines one or more characteristics of a given sample, product, process, or service. The purpose of testing involves a prior determination of expected observation and a comparison of that expectation to what one actually observes. The results of testing can be qualitative (yes/no), quantitative (a measured value), or categorical and can be derived from personal observation or the output of a precision measuring instrument.

Usually the test result is the dependent variable, the measured response based on the particular conditions of the test or the level of the independent variable. Some tests, however, may involve changing the independent variable to determine the level at which a certain response occurs: in this case, the test result is the independent variable.

Importance
In software development, engineering, science, manufacturing, and business, its developers, researchers, manufacturers, and related personnel must understand and agree upon methods of obtaining data and making measurements. It is common for a physical property to be strongly affected by the precise method of testing or measuring that property. As such, fully documenting experiments and measurements while providing needed documentation and descriptions of specifications, contracts, and test methods is vital.

Using a standardized test method, perhaps published by a respected standards organization, is a good place to start. Sometimes it is more useful to modify an existing test method or to develop a new one, though such home-grown test methods should be validated and, in certain cases, demonstrate technical equivalency to primary, standardized methods. Again, documentation and full disclosure are necessary.

A well-written test method is important. However, even more important is choosing a method of measuring the correct property or characteristic. Not all tests and measurements are equally useful: usually a test result is used to predict or imply suitability for a certain purpose. For example, if a manufactured item has several components, test methods may have several levels of connections:

 test results of a raw material should connect with tests of a component made from that material
 test results of a component should connect with performance testing of a complete item
 results of laboratory performance testing should connect with field performance

These connections or correlations may be based on published literature, engineering studies, or formal programs such as quality function deployment. Validation of the suitability of the test method is often required.

Content
Quality management systems usually require full documentation of the procedures used in a test. The document for a test method might include:

 descriptive title
 scope over which class(es) of items, policies, etc. may be evaluated
 date of last effective revision and revision designation
 reference to most recent test method validation 
 person, office, or agency responsible for questions on the test method, updates, and deviations
 significance or importance of the test method and its intended use
 terminology and definitions to clarify the meanings of the test method
 types of apparatus and measuring instrument (sometimes the specific device) required to conduct the test
 sampling procedures (how samples are to be obtained and prepared, as well as the sample size)
 safety precautions
 required calibrations and metrology systems
 natural environment concerns and considerations
 testing environment concerns and considerations
 detailed procedures for conducting the test
 calculation and analysis of data
 interpretation of data and test method output
 report format, content, data, etc.

Validation 
Test methods are often scrutinized for their validity, applicability, and accuracy. It is very important that the scope of the test method be clearly defined, and any aspect included in the scope is shown to be accurate and repeatable through validation.

Test method validations often encompass the following considerations:

 accuracy and precision; demonstration of accuracy may require the creation of a reference value if none is yet available
 repeatability and reproducibility, sometimes in the form of a Gauge R&R.
 range, or a continuum scale over which the test method would be considered accurate (e.g., 10 N to 100 N force test)
 measurement resolution, be it spatial, temporal, or otherwise
 curve fitting, typically for linearity, which justifies interpolation between calibrated reference points
 robustness, or the insensitivity to potentially subtle variables in the test environment or setup which may be difficult to control
 usefulness to predict end-use characteristics and performance   
 measurement uncertainty
 interlaboratory or round robin tests 
 other types of measurement systems analysis

See also 

Certified reference materials
Data analysis
Design of experiments
Document management system
EPA Methods
Integrated test facility
Measurement systems analysis
Measurement uncertainty
Metrication
Observational error
Replication (statistics)
Sampling (statistics)
Specification (technical standard)
Test management approach
Verification and validation

References

General references, books
 Pyzdek, T, "Quality Engineering Handbook", 2003,  
 Godfrey, A. B., "Juran's Quality Handbook", 1999, 
 Kimothi, S. K., "The Uncertainty of Measurements: Physical and Chemical Metrology: Impact and Analysis", 2002,

Related standards
 ASTM E177 Standard Practice for Use of the Terms Precision and Bias in ASTM Test Methods
 ASTM E691 Standard Practice for Conducting an Interlaboratory Study to Determine the Precision of a Test Method
 ASTM E1488 Standard Guide for Statistical Procedures to Use in Developing and Applying Test Methods
 ASTM E2282 Standard Guide for Defining the Test Result of a Test Method
 ASTM E2655 - Standard Guide for Reporting Uncertainty of Test Results and Use of the Term Measurement Uncertainty in ASTM Test Methods

Metrology
Measurement
Quality control